Langport Railway Cutting is a 0.5 hectare geological Site of Special Scientific Interest at Langport in Somerset, England, notified in 1992. It is a Geological Conservation Review site.

Gravels exposed at Langport Railway Cutting show scour-and-fill structures consistent with braided stream deposition. This site is of importance as one of the few permanently exposed localities for coldstage Pleistocene gravels in south Somerset and more particularly because it is the first site in Britain in which typical calcrete features have been recorded. As such it is of national significance and has considerable research potential.

Sources
 English Nature citation sheet for the site (accessed 10 August 2006)

External links
 English Nature website (SSSI information)

Sites of Special Scientific Interest in Somerset
Sites of Special Scientific Interest notified in 1992
Railway cuttings in the United Kingdom
Rail transport in Somerset
Geology of Somerset
Langport